Lura (born Maria de Lurdes Assunção Pina; 31 July 1975, Lisbon) is a Portuguese singer and musician, of Cape Verdean descent. Her compositions are based on traditional Cape-Verdean music as for example the Morna, Funaná and Batuque, and influenced by African and contemporary Western music.

Biography
The Portuguese voice that leads us to the Cape Verdean nostalgia

Maria de Lurdes Assunção Pina – which artistic name is Lura – was born on 31 July 1975, in Alfredo da Costa Maternity, Lisbon.  She is a daughter of Cape Verdean parents, her mother was born in Santo Antão and her father in Santiago. Lura was the first of 4 brothers and was the only artist in the family. Her soul is imbue with two cultures that are present in her life, her melodies and in her artist path: the Portuguese and the Cape Verdean.

Being the eldest daughter and child of divorced parents Lura became a fighter. She always felt the need to be at her mother side and fight to give her brothers a better life, even if she had to give up a bit her of childhood. But she passes through the hardest moments of her life with a permanent smile in her face, and without bitterness or pain.

Growing up in social neighbourhood she believes that the place where she lived wouldn't made her a looser or a resigned person. On the other and she gain the perspective that the persistence, hard work and determination would be the key for a future wonderful life.

The Athlete, Dance or Singer

Lura's determination, focus and hard work will only position her as one of the best in any field of her life and because of this characteristic the world almost lost an international singer (and maybe one of the biggest expressions of the Cape Verdean culture) to win an athlete or a dancer.  But for the disgrace of the dancers and swimming lovers she followed the path of the musical notes.

Everything started with Juka, a São Tomé singer that invited her to participate in his album. Lura remembers: “I had only seventeen years old and was supposed to do some chorus but at the end Juka asked me to perform a duo with him. I’ve never dreamed of singing but he insisted and…” This was the moment when she discovers her profound and sensual voice! But she didn't feel the need to take the music serious and preferred to follow her sports and dance dream, even with the tremendous success of the Hit.

At the age of 21 a Portuguese producer help her to record her first album. This was an album with a strong commercial component and with a musical style more directed for dance and her generation. The song “Nha Vida” (My life) turned into a Hit when it was included in the album Red Hot + Lisbon, in 1997.   At this is the moment Lura's life turns definitely into the music and performing (also due to a sports injury).

The “Na Ri Na" Success

It was the year of 2000 when Lura does a duo with Bonga in the song "Mulemba Xangola" and the recording company of the well-kwon Cesária Evora - Lusafrica - discovers her talent. They signed with the artist and in 2004 and they produced the album Di Korpu Ku Alma (From Body and Soul). This was the  first truly Cape Verdean Lura's album, that quickly goes across borders and was released in more than 10 countries including USA, Italy and UK – where it was nominated for the BBC World Music Awards.

The famous writer José Eduardo Agualusa quotes about the album Di Korpu Ku Alma: "… The future of the Cape Verdean music has a name and that name is Lura”. At the same time the Britannic journal, The Independent states: "… when she starts with her international career this girl will fill-up the stadiums”.

In November 2006 was released the new album M’bem di Fora (I came from outside) and in France, Lura was nominated for the “Victoires de la Musique", in the best album category. She also does a World tour with this album and conquers an audience more and more faithful and attentive to her music. Three years later, the album Eclipse confirms the singer enormous success, turning Lura into the pearl of new generation of the Cape Verdean music.  At this time Lura states: “My career is a constant surprise, since the discovery of my own voice in my teenager times until today. I live day by day, but one thing I can't deny: I will sing until the last day of my life”.

In 2010, Lusafrica releases the album The Best of Lura that collects her best songs and includes the hit “Moda Bô” – a song that she wrote to honour the diva Cesária Évora featuring the diva herself. The Best of also includes a DVD with a Lura's Concert. As any other artist, Lura was heartbroken when Cesária Évora passed away in December 2011. One year after she made her a tribute to Cesária with the song “Nós Diva”, only released on the YouTube.

Returning to her Cape Verdean Roots and coming back to Lisbon

Lura decided to move to Praia City to experience the Cape Verdean reality. She consolidates her relationship with Cape Verdean musicians and Composers but for her fans joy she continues to perform all over the World. She returns to the studios to record her album Herança in 2015. This album has strong Cape Verdean influence: is vibrant and frankly danceable with songs like “Maria di Lida”, “Sabi di Más” and “Ness Tempo di Nha Bidjissa” with the rhythm of Funaná and imbue with the Island real energy, retreating  the Cape Verdean Intensity, their people, traditions in the most charismatic and melodic voice of her generation: Lura's voice.

In 2016 Lura gives birth to her beautiful daughter Nina and in 2018 returns to her hometown, Lisbon. Also in 2018 an EP was released with the song “ALguem di Alguem” (a frenetic and rhythmic funana) and “Crespuscular Solidão” a song featuring Gael Faye as a tribute to Cesária Évora. This theme was performed for the first time at the Festival Sakifo in La Réunion Island.

In January 2021 Lura initiates a revolution in her life: She changes her manager and team to Miguel Garcia (manager) and Lisboa Amsterdam. This revolutions starts with the conception and recording of her new album that has the production of the young but already promising Portuguese producer Agir. This album promises to celebrate the Luso-African culture with one of its more important and actual identity: the singer Lura. October 2021 is the planned date for the release of the so expected new album.  In 2021 Lura also celebrates 25 years of career.

Discography

Albums
All of the albums were released by Lusafrica with the exception of Nha Vida and Herança
Nha Vida (1996)
In Love (2002)
Di Korpu Ku Alma (2005)
M'bem di fora (2006)
Eclipse (2009)
Herança (2015)

Compilation album
Best Of''' (2010)

Singles
"Nha Vida" - in the album "Nha Vida, later appeared in the live album Onda Sonora: Red Hot + Lisbon and the compilation Best Of
"Interlude", performed by DJ Wally + Lura - in the live album Onda Sonora: Red Hot + Lisbon
"Libramor" - in the album Eclipse
"Um Dia" (ALUPEK: Un Dia) - in the album Eclipse, also appeared in the compilation Best Of
"Tabanka" - in the album Eclipse
"Canta Um Tango" (ALUPEK: Kanta Un Tangu) - in the album Eclipse"Nhu Santiago" in the album Herança"Moda Bô" in the compilation Best Of"Amor É Tão Sabe" - in the compilation Best Of"Na Ri Na" - in the compilation Best Of"Ponciana" - in the compilation Best Of"Vazulina" - in the compilation Best Of"Quebrod Nem Djosa" - in the compilation Best OfDVDs
All releases here were by LusafricaDi Korpu Ku Alma (2005)Best Of'' (2010)

References

External links 

 Official Webpage
https://www.instagram.com/lura_criola/
 Lura on www.african-music-guide.com Lura's Biography on the African Music Guide
 Lura at Mindelo Infos 

1975 births
Living people
21st-century Portuguese women singers
Portuguese people of Cape Verdean descent
Singers from Lisbon